RMC Découverte is a French television channel broadcast on channel 24 and owned by NextRadioTV.  Created in 2012, it mainly broadcasts documentaries such as Wheeler Dealers, Ancient Aliens, Swamp Loggers. RMC Découverte broadcasts the French version of the British show Top Gear.

History 
After the announcement of the Superior council of audiovisual for a call for candidate of six channels emitting on French TNT in high definition, the group NextRadioTV sends three files: RMC Sport HD (a sport channel ), RMC Découverte broadcasting documentaries and BFM Business, an economic channel already broadcasting in the Paris TNT area. NextRadioTV chooses the name RMC Découverte for its documentary channel in order to promote RMC radio, which the group also owns but which is not received by all the French population due to its broadcasting on FM broadcasting 1.

Programming 
 +39-45 mégastructures
 Auction Hunters
 Alien Theory
 Aquamen
 Américars (Fast N' Loud)
 Bush Alaska
 Car SOS
 Cars restoration (Overhaulin') 
 Champs de bataille
 Chasseurs de coffres-forts (The Safecrackers)
 Chasseur de pierres 'précieuses
 Constructions sauvages
 Destruction tout bénef ! (Bid & Destroy)
 Dirty Jobs
 Enchères à l'aveugle (Property Wars)
 Jade Fever 
 Les Bûcherons de l'extrême (American Loggers)
 Les Bûcherons du marais (Swamp Loggers)
 Machines de génie
 Retour à l'instinct primaire
 Seuls face à l'Alaska (Mountain Men)
 Top Gear
 Top Gear France
 Top Gear USA
 Vintage Mecanic
 Wheeler Dealers France
 Wheeler Dealers
 Yukon Gold
 Convois XXL
 X machines de titan2

References

External links 
  

Television stations in France
Television channels and stations established in 2012
2012 establishments in France
French-language television stations
Documentary television channels